Taavi Rähn (born 16 May 1981) is a retired Estonian professional footballer. He played in the position of a centre-back.

Club career
He started his professional career with Flora as a centre-back, then moved on to Ukrainian Premier League club Volyn Lutsk.

In 2006, he joined Lithuanian side Ekranas.

In 2010, he was on trial at Qingdao Jonoon of the Chinese Super League.

In March 2011, he signed a deal with China League One club Tianjin Songjiang.

In January 2013, he signed with Chinese League One club Hunan Billows on a free transfer.

International career
Rähn made his debut for the Estonia national football team in 2001. He scored an own goal playing against England on 13 October 2007, in an attempt to clear the ball from outside his own box, he cleanly headed Ashley Cole's cross onto his own post, and past keeper and teammate Mart Poom. He made a total of 74 appearances for the senior national side.

Honours

Club
Flora
Meistriliiga: 2002, 2003
Estonian Supercup: 2014

Ekranas
A Lyga: 2008, 2009

Levadia
Estonian Supercup: 2015

References

External links

1981 births
Living people
Sportspeople from Pärnu
Estonian footballers
Estonia international footballers
Estonia under-21 international footballers
Estonia youth international footballers
Viljandi JK Tulevik players
Meistriliiga players
FC Flora players
Estonian expatriate footballers
Estonian expatriate sportspeople in Ukraine
Expatriate footballers in Ukraine
FC Volyn Lutsk players
Ukrainian Premier League players
Ukrainian First League players
Expatriate footballers in Lithuania
Estonian expatriate sportspeople in Lithuania
Expatriate footballers in Azerbaijan
Estonian expatriate sportspeople in Azerbaijan
Expatriate footballers in Russia
Estonian expatriate sportspeople in Russia
FC Baltika Kaliningrad players
Estonian expatriate sportspeople in China
Expatriate footballers in China
Tianjin Tianhai F.C. players
Hunan Billows players
China League One players
Expatriate footballers in Finland
Estonian expatriate sportspeople in Finland
FCI Levadia Tallinn players
Paide Linnameeskond players
Association football defenders
Neftçi PFK players
Azerbaijan Premier League players
Veikkausliiga players
JK Tervis Pärnu players